Frontier Colony is a neighborhood in the Karachi West district of Karachi, Pakistan. It was previously administered as part of the SITE Town borough, which was disbanded in 2011.

There are several ethnic groups in S.I.T.E. Town including Pakhtuns, Punjabi, Seraikis etc. Majority of Residence is Pakhtuns. Frontier Colony having 1 to 3 numbers & maximum area is Unplanned area where small premises & low income people living. There is 1 Union Council (UC-14).

References

External links 
 Karachi Website .
 Local Government Sindh.

Neighbourhoods of Karachi
SITE Town